Oslo is a discothèque, bar and food venue located in Hackney Central, East London. It is the first club to open in that area of Hackney. Notable musicians that played in it since 2014 opening are Marina and the Diamonds, Klaxons, Sky Ferreira and others.

Oslo Hackney, the club's bookings are run by Conrad Rogan.

DJs that have played in the venue include AJ Odudu, Frederick Macpherson, Billie JD Porter, George Craig and Jack Peñate.

Jessie J performed an exclusive concert on her birthday on March 27, 2014.

References

External links
The new Yoofemisms: stay down with the kids with some super-hot lingo Sky Ferreira in Oslo Hackney, London Evening Standard, March 2014
Hackney gets a new music venue, restaurant and bar in Oslo, TimeOut London, January 2014
How to throw the best/worst social media party in Oslo Hackney. The Daily Dot, March 2014

Nightclubs in London
2014 in London
2014 establishments in England
Hackney, London